Shur Tappeh may refer to:
 Shur Tappeh, Afghanistan
 Shur Tappeh, Iran